Salisbury by-election may refer to one of many parliamentary by-elections held for the British House of Commons constituency of Salisbury (UK Parliament constituency), including three in the 20th century, which are:

1869 Salisbury by-election
1931 Salisbury by-election
1942 Salisbury by-election
1965 Salisbury by-election

See also
Salisbury (UK Parliament constituency)
Salisbury District Council elections